Roland Paulze d'Ivoy de la Poype (28 July 1920 – 23 October 2012) was a Second World War fighter ace, a member of the Normandie-Niemen fighter group that fought on the Soviet front. He was also a plastic industry pioneer and founder of the Antibes Marineland in 1970.

Early life
His father, an agronomist and reserve officer in the French army, was killed at the front in May 1940.

Wartime service
Aged 19 years old in August 1939 de la Poype enrolled in the French air force and began training as a pilot. He finished his training in March 1940, shortly before the German invasion of France. With comrades from the fighter training school of Etampes, he managed to flee to Saint-Jean-de-Luz to board a ship to England.

After serving in French Equatorial Africa from July 1940 to January 1941 with the Free French Air Force, he joined the Royal Air Force as a Sergeant and was assigned to No 602 Squadron, flying Supermarine Spitfires in July 1941. An indication of his flying abilities, he was selected as wingman by the squadron's commanding officer, 32-victory Irish ace, Squadron Leader Paddy Finucane.

He claimed his first aircraft destroyed, a Messerschmitt Bf 109, on 22 August 1942 over Gravelines, and flew more than 60 combat missions. 

Upon learning that a group of French volunteers was to be sent to the Soviet front, he joined the Normandie fighter group and was part of the first batch of 12 French pilots who, via transfers through Lebanon and Iraq, arrived in Ivanovo in the Soviet Union on 28 November 1942. The two squadrons, initially called the Normandie Group, were assigned the Yak-1B fighter and attached to the 303rd Fighter Aviation Division of the 1st Air Army. 

On 31 August 1943 he shot down a Ju 87 Stuka dive-bomber. This was his second aerial victory and his first on the Soviet front. 

He ended the war with a total tally of 16 confirmed aerial victories (7 solo and 9 shared victories), one (and 11 shared) probables, and one aircraft damaged in almost 200 missions, most of which were achieved while flying with top French ace and Commanding Officer Marcel Albert. De la Poype was one of only four members of the regiment to be awarded the title of Hero of the Soviet Union.

After leaving the Soviet Union on 20 June 1945 he became an air attaché in Belgium and later Yugoslavia before retiring from the air force in 1947.

Plastic industry career
An inventor,  de La Poype understood that plastics and disposable packaging would become very important. As head of the Société d'Etudes et d'Applications du Plastique, he set up his first plastics factory in May 1947. He is also the designer of the Citroen Mehari.

Marineland in Antibes
De la Poype created the Marineland in Antibes in 1970 in order to educate the public about marine life. He retired in 1985 but retained ownernership until 2006. He and his artist wife Marie-Nöelle lived in a lavish Paris apartment a half-mile from the Trocadero.

He was also mayor of Champigné and was the owner of a golf course near Angers.

Writings
Roland de la Poype, L'épopée du Normandie-Niémen, Perrin, 2007

Medals and awards
 Grand Croix of the French Légion d'Honneur, the order's highest rank
Compagnon de la Libération (29 December 1944)
Croix de Guerre 1939-45 with 12 citations
Czechoslovak War Cross 1939-1945
Soviet awards
Hero of the Soviet Union
Order of the Red Banner
Order of Lenin
Order of the Patriotic War, 1st class
Medal "For the Victory over Germany in the Great Patriotic War 1941–1945"

References

External links
 Roland de La Poype - Mémorial Normandie Niemen
 Roland de La Poype - l'Ordre de la libération
 Roland de La Poype - Aerostories

French Air and Space Force personnel
French World War II flying aces
Free French military personnel of World War II
Foreign Heroes of the Soviet Union
Recipients of the Order of Lenin
Recipients of the Croix de Guerre 1939–1945 (France)
Recipients of the Order of the Red Banner
Recipients of the Czechoslovak War Cross
Grand Croix of the Légion d'honneur
Companions of the Liberation
Mayors of places in Pays de la Loire
1920 births
2012 deaths
French expatriates in the Soviet Union
Air attachés